Remo Tellini (born 11 October 1972) is a Brazilian equestrian. He competed in two events at the 2004 Summer Olympics.

References

External links
 

1972 births
Living people
Brazilian male equestrians
Olympic equestrians of Brazil
Equestrians at the 2004 Summer Olympics
People from Franca
Sportspeople from São Paulo (state)